Bishnu Pada Ray (born 19 June 1950) is an Indian politician and a leader of the Bharatiya Janata Party. In 1999, he was elected to 13th Lok Sabha from Andaman and Nicobar Islands constituency. He was re-elected from the same constituency to the 15th Lok Sabha in 2009 and to the 16th Lok Sabha in 2014.

Notes

External links 
Political Information

1950 births
Living people
India MPs 1999–2004
India MPs 2009–2014
University of Calcutta alumni
People from Port Blair
Lok Sabha members from the Andaman and Nicobar Islands
India MPs 2014–2019
Bharatiya Janata Party politicians from the Andaman and Nicobar Islands